The Malawi terror beast refers to a rabid hyena which killed at least three people and severely injured 16 others in the central Dowa district, some  from Lilongwe, in 2003.

History

Attacks
The attacks began in 2003. Surviving victims sustained serious disfiguring injuries, with some of them losing both legs and hands while two lost both ears and eyes. One woman had her mouth and nose torn out by the beast. At least 4,000 people left four villages in the central Dowa district to seek refuge at a community hall at the district headquarters in order to escape.

An eyewitness reported that animal resembled one which was shot the year before by game rangers and paramilitary police which was responsible for the deaths of five people and the maiming of over 20. Wildlife officials identified the beast as a rabid hyena.

References

Carnivoran attacks
Hyenas
History of Malawi
Man-eaters